Garces National Forest was established by the U.S. Forest Service in Arizona on July 1, 1908 with  from portions of Baboquivari, Tumacacori and Huachuca National Forests.  It was named in honor of Franciscan missionary Father Francisco Garcés – an early explorer of southwestern North America including Arizona and southern California. On July 1, 1911 the forest was combined with Coronado National Forest and the name was discontinued.

References

External links
 Forest History Society
 Listing of the National Forests of the United States and Their Dates (from the Forest History Society website) Text from Davis, Richard C., ed. Encyclopedia of American Forest and Conservation History. New York: Macmillan Publishing Company for the Forest History Society, 1983. Vol. II, pp. 743–788.

Former National Forests of Arizona
Coronado National Forest
Protected areas established in 1908
1908 establishments in Arizona Territory
1911 disestablishments in Arizona Territory
Protected areas disestablished in 1911